Giovanni "Gianni" Toppan (8 November 1920 – 1 February 1987) was an Italian professional footballer, who played as a midfielder.

External links 
Profile at MagliaRossonera.it 

1920 births
1987 deaths
Italian footballers
Association football midfielders
Serie A players
A.C. Milan players